Reforma Films was a Mexican film production company.

Selected filmography
La red (1953)
Siete mujeres (1953) 
The Proud and the Beautiful (1953) 
Retorno a la juventud (1954) 
Las tres Elenas (1954) 
Chucho el Roto (1955)
María la Voz (1955)
Non scherzare con le donne (1955) 
Las hijas de Elena (1964)

References

Film production companies of Mexico